A Tailor Made Man is a 1931 American MGM pre-Code comedy film directed by Sam Wood. Adapted from the 1908 Hungarian play A Szerencse Fia by Gábor Drégely (staged in English in New York in 1917), the film stars William Haines and Dorothy Jordan.

On Broadway, Grant Mitchell starred in the 1917 production and a revival in 1929. The play was the basis for a 1922 American silent film, A Tailor-Made Man.

Cast
William Haines - John Paul Bart
Dorothy Jordan - Tanya 
Joseph Cawthorn - Huber
Marjorie Rambeau - Kitty Dupuy
William Austin - Theodore Jellicott
Ian Keith - Doctor Gustav von Sonntag
Hedda Hopper - Mrs. Stanlaw
Henry Armetta - Peter
Walter Walker - Abraham Nathan
Forrester Harvey - Arthur Pomeroy
Joan Marsh - Bessie
Martha Sleeper - Corrine

References

External links

 allmovie/synopsis; A Tailor Made Man
Turner Classic Movies entry

1931 films
American black-and-white films
Metro-Goldwyn-Mayer films
Films directed by Sam Wood
1931 comedy films
American comedy films
American films based on plays
Films with screenplays by Edgar Allan Woolf
1930s English-language films
1930s American films